Mario Ayelar Valdez (born November 19, 1974) is a Mexican former professional baseball first baseman. He played during three Major League Baseball (MLB) seasons for the Chicago White Sox and Oakland Athletics. Valdez also played one season in Nippon Professional Baseball (NPB) for the Kintetsu Buffaloes in 2004.

Career
Valdez was drafted by the White Sox in the 48th round of the 1993 amateur draft. Valdez played his first professional season with their Class A (Short Season) Utica Blue Sox in 1986, and his last season with the independent Pensacola Central of the Central League, in 2004. His last affiliated season was in 2003, when he played for the San Diego Padres' Triple-A unit, the Portland Beavers.

Valdez played with Mexican team Tomateros de Culiacan in winter ball in La Liga Mexicana del Pacifico. He debuted in 1995 with the team which won the championship the same year, also playing in 1996-1997, 2001-2002, 2003–2004 and the Caribbean Series in 1996-2002.

References

External links

1974 births
Algodoneros de Guasave players
Baseball players at the 2007 Pan American Games
Baseball players from Sonora
Birmingham Barons players
Calgary Cannons players
Central American and Caribbean Games bronze medalists for Mexico
Charlotte Knights players
Chicago White Sox players
Competitors at the 2006 Central American and Caribbean Games
Diablos Rojos del México players
Guerreros de Oaxaca players
Gulf Coast White Sox players
Hickory Crawdads players
Living people
Major League Baseball first basemen
Major League Baseball players from Mexico
Mexican expatriate baseball players in Canada
Mexican expatriate baseball players in Japan
Mexican expatriate baseball players in the United States
Mexican League baseball first basemen
Modesto A's players
Nashville Sounds players
Oakland Athletics players
Osaka Kintetsu Buffaloes players
Pan American Games medalists in baseball
Pan American Games bronze medalists for Mexico
Pensacola Pelicans players
Portland Beavers players
Sacramento River Cats players
Salt Lake Buzz players
South Bend Silver Hawks players
Sultanes de Monterrey players
Tomateros de Culiacán players
Toros de Tijuana players
Vaqueros Laguna players
Venados de Mazatlán players
Visalia Oaks players
Yaquis de Obregón players
People from Ciudad Obregón
Central American and Caribbean Games medalists in baseball
Medalists at the 2007 Pan American Games